The following is a list of notable Bellingham residents, those people of recognition who have lived in Bellingham, Washington.

Living in Bellingham

Born in Bellingham

Raised in Bellingham

Lived in Bellingham

Died in Bellingham
 Isaac Smith Kalloch, mayor of San Francisco

History of Bellingham

Julius Bloedel (1864–1957), businessman
Dirty Dan Harris (c. 1833–1890), founder of Fairhaven
C. X. Larrabee (1843–1914), businessman
George Pickett (1825–1875), Confederate general

References

Bellingham, Washington
 
Bellingham